The Sri Lanka cricket team toured Australia in January and February 2019 to play two Test matches for the Warne–Muralitharan Trophy. The first Test, in Brisbane, was a day/night match. They also played a three-day warm-up match ahead of the Test series. In April 2018, Cricket Australia confirmed that the Manuka Oval would host its first ever Test match. Australia won the series 2–0, with Tim Paine winning his first Test series as captain of Australia.

Squads

Before the start of the series, Josh Hazlewood was ruled out of Australia's squad due to a back injury and was replaced by Jhye Richardson. Ahead of the first Test, Kurtis Patterson was added to Australia's squad. Pat Cummins and Travis Head were named the joint vice-captains of the Australian Test squad. Ahead of the second Test, Marcus Stoinis was added to Australia's squad, replacing Matt Renshaw.

Nuwan Pradeep was ruled out of Sri Lanka's squad before the Test series after suffering a hamstring injury during the warm-up match. Vishwa Fernando was named as his replacement in the team. Dushmantha Chameera and Lahiru Kumara were both ruled out of Sri Lanka's squad for the second Test due to injury. Chamika Karunaratne was added to Sri Lanka's squad as a replacement for Kumara.

Tour match

Three-day match: Cricket Australia XI vs Sri Lanka

Test series

1st Test

2nd Test

Notes

References

External links
 Series home at ESPN Cricinfo

2019 in Australian cricket
2019 in Sri Lankan cricket
International cricket competitions in 2018–19
Sri Lankan cricket tours of Australia
2018–19 Australian cricket season